Eilema protuberans is a moth of the subfamily Arctiinae first described by Frederic Moore in 1878. It is found in the Indian state of Sikkim and Bhutan.

References

protuberans